Viken L. Babikian is an American doctor of Armenian origin and professor of neurology at Boston University School of Medicine.

Babikian received his undergraduate degree from the American University of Beirut, and his M.D. from Northwestern University School of Medicine. He completed a neurology residency at the University of Chicago Hospitals and a stroke fellowship at the Massachusetts General Hospital. He joined the Boston University Department of Neurology in 1986. He studies cerebrovascular disorders such as stroke.

References

External links
Boston University School of Medicine: Clinical Faculty: Viken L. Babikian, MD 
Boston Medical Center: Stroke & Cerebrovascular Center: Viken Babikian, MD

American neurologists
Lebanese emigrants to the United States
University of Chicago alumni
Massachusetts General Hospital fellows
Boston University faculty
Feinberg School of Medicine alumni
American University of Beirut alumni
Living people
Lebanese people of Armenian descent
American people of Armenian descent
Year of birth missing (living people)